Tocoi is a former settlement along the St. Johns River in St. Johns County, Florida. John Westcott represented it in the Florida House of Representative in 1879.

Tocoi was the site of a ferry landing and a local rail line to St. Augustine, Florida. The name is said to come from a Native American word for water lily. The Tocoi Creek in the area is a tributary of the St. Johns. A commercial Spanish moss factory was in the area.

Elizabeth Stuart Phelps Ward's 1879 book Sealed Orders features Tocoi and its train station as a setting.

References

St. Johns County, Florida